Yvonne Bauer (born 1977) is a German billionaire businesswoman, the fifth generation to head up Bauer Media Group.

Early life
Yvonne Bauer is the daughter of Heinz Bauer and Gudrun Bauer. She received a bachelor's degree in German philology from the University of Bamberg.

Career
She was apprenticed at the publishers Hoffmann and Campe, before joining Bauer in 2005. In 2010, she became the CEO, after her father transferred 85% of the company to her and 5% to each of her older sisters, Mirja, Nicola and Saskia. She also serves as the publisher of Heinrich Bauer Verlag KG.

As of November 2022, Forbes estimated her net worth at US$2.5 billion.

Personal life
In 2014 she married Enno Koch, a German television journalist and producer. They have twins, and live in Hamburg.

References

1977 births
Living people
Female billionaires
German billionaires
Women in publishing
German publishers (people)
German magazine publishers (people)
Yvonne
Date of birth missing (living people)
Businesspeople from Hamburg
Place of birth missing (living people)